Glyptothorax kashmirensis is a species of catfish that was described by Sunder Lal Hora in 1923. Glyptothorax kashmirensis is a species in genus Glyptothorax, family Sisoridae and order Siluriformes. IUCN categorise the species as critically endangered globally. No subspecies are listed in Catalogue of Life.

References 

Glyptothorax
Fish described in 1923